Davariyeh (also Romanized as Dāvarīyeh; also known as Gonbeyeh Kan) is a village in Roqicheh Rural District, Kadkan District, Torbat-e Heydarieh County, Razavi Khorasan Province, Iran. At the 2006 census, its population was 193, in 37 families.

References 

Populated places in Torbat-e Heydarieh County